Gambsheim is a commune in the Bas-Rhin department and Grand Est region of north-eastern France, in the historical region of Alsace.

Geography
Gambsheim lies adjacent to a river-crossing into Germany that is favoured by southbound traffic on the A35 autoroute wishing to avoid traffic delays around Strasbourg. The crossing coincides with the location of a large river lock which is also the site of one of the Rhine's first fish ladders. The latter was installed to support migratory fish in general and, more specifically, in an attempt to restore the abundant salmon population for which the upper Rhine was famous before the early 20th century, when the installation of a series of locks rendered the river navigable beyond Basel for boats, but blocked it for migrating fish.

Population

Landmarks
 The church of St Nazaire.
 Gambsheim lock gates (Upper Rhine).
 Town hall, built in 1823 to replace an 18th-century building.
 Gambsheim hydroelectrical power plant; established in 1967, it produces 141 MW.

See also
 Communes of the Bas-Rhin department

References

External links

 The Gambsheim fish ladder (In French)

Bas-Rhin communes articles needing translation from French Wikipedia
Communes of Bas-Rhin